Timothy Armitage (1675–1715) was an Irish politician.

Armitage was educated at Trinity College, Dublin. He was MP for Randalstown in County Antrim from  1703 to 1713.

References

Irish MPs 1703–1713
Alumni of Trinity College Dublin
1675 births
1715 deaths